Fiumalbo is a comune (municipality) in the Province of Modena in the Italian region Emilia-Romagna, located about  southwest of Bologna and about  southwest of Modena. 

Fiumalbo borders the following municipalities: Coreglia Antelminelli, Abetone Cutigliano, Fanano, Pievepelago, Riolunato, Sestola.

History

Fiumalbo is a very old mountain village with almost 1 000 years of written history, but its origins are much older and are lost in the centuries. A border town, it has experienced the events that have changed history with detachment and distance, considering those events unrelated to the history of the town.

Some sources report that the first inhabitants of the Fiumalbo Valley were the Ligurian-Frinians, who took refuge in the Modenese Apennines from the Po Valley in the 2nd century BC. The village of Fiumalbo is mentioned in an act of 1038, which sanctioned the cession of the 'Rocca che si chiama Fiumalbo' (fortress called Fiumalbo) by the Marquis Bonifacio di Canossa to the Bishop of Modena Viberto (Bonifacio was the father of Matilde di Canossa). In 1197 many people from Fiumalbo swore loyalty to the Municipality of Modena, making their territory and men available for any military needs. The oath was reconfirmed by the representatives of the Fiumalbo Community in 1205 and 1276.

References

External links

 Official website  
 

Municipalities of the Province of Modena
Cities and towns in Emilia-Romagna